Cymindis paivana is a species of ground beetle in the subfamily Harpalinae. It was described by Thomas Vernon Wollaston in 1860.

References

paivana
Beetles described in 1860